In coding theory and information theory, a binary erasure channel (BEC) is a communications channel model. A transmitter sends a bit (a zero or a one), and the receiver either receives the bit correctly, or with some probability  receives a message that the bit was not received ("erased") .

Definition 
A binary erasure channel with erasure probability  is a channel with binary input, ternary output, and probability of erasure . That is, let  be the transmitted random variable with alphabet . Let  be the received variable with alphabet , where  is the erasure symbol. Then, the channel is characterized by the conditional probabilities:

Capacity 

{| class="toccolours collapsible collapsed" width="80%" style="text-align:left"
!Proof
|-
The channel capacity is:

Observe that, for the binary entropy function  (which has value 1 for input ),

By definition , so
.
|}

If the sender is notified when a bit is erased, they can repeatedly transmit each bit until it is correctly received, attaining the capacity . However, by the noisy-channel coding theorem, the capacity of  can be obtained even without such feedback.

Related channels 
If bits are erased but the receiver is not notified (i.e. does not receive the output ) then the channel is a deletion channel, and its capacity is an open problem.

History 
The BEC was introduced by Peter Elias of MIT in 1955 as a toy example.

See also 
 Erasure code
 Packet erasure channel

Notes

References 
 
 
 

Coding theory